Bulgarians in Kazakhstan are an ethnic minority in Kazakhstan, and make up a small percentage of the population.

Number and share

Censuses 

Number and share of Bulgarians according to the census over the years by regions:

Prominent ethnic Bulgarians from Kazakhstan

  (b. 1946), politician

See also
Bulgaria–Kazakhstan relations
Demographics of Kazakhstan

References

 
Kazakhstan
Kazakhstan
European diaspora in Kazakhstan
Ethnic groups in Kazakhstan